Daniel Kevin Boshell (born 30 May 1981) is an English former professional footballer and assistant manager of Bradford Park Avenue.

As a player he was a midfielder between 1999 and 2020 playing most of his career in the Football League, notably for Grimsby Town where he made 118 appearances in all competitions. He also played as a professional for Oldham Athletic, Stockport County, Bury and Chesterfield before finishing his career in non-league football with Guiseley, Altrincham and Bradford Park Avenue.

Playing career

Oldham Athletic
Boshell spent 6 years at Oldham Athletic after coming through their youth system and by 2004 was their longest serving player, Boshell finally left the club in 2005 after a loan spell at
Bury. He turned out 70 times in the league for The Latics, scoring twice.

Stockport County
Boshell signed for Stockport County for the 2005–06 season and played 33 times in the league, scoring one goal. He was released at the end of the season.

Grimsby Town
Boshell was given a pre season trial by Grimsby in the summer of 2006 by Graham Rodger and earned a non-contracted squad position, joining on 25 August.
He made his league debut against Macclesfield Town in a 1–1 draw at Blundell Park, and was offered a deal to keep him at the club until the end of the season.

In 2007–08 Boshell helped Grimsby Town reach the final of the Football League Trophy. However, in the final he missed a penalty when the score was 0-0 and Grimsby went on to lose 2–0.

During the 2008–2009 season under Mike Newell he was used as a utility player, and in the 2009–10 season, Poor form saw him fall out of favour under Newell, and his eventual replacement Neil Woods following a poor disciplinary record, in which he was sent off twice in the first couple of months of the season.

Boshell continued to struggle to break into the Grimsby first team and on 13 January 2010, Woods told Boshell he was free to leave the club in the January transfer window. On 1 February 2010, Boshells contract was terminated  .

Chesterfield
Boshell appeared 9 times for the club in the closing stages of the 09/10 season, Boshell was released at the end of the season.

Guiseley
On 27 August 2010, Boshell signed for Non-League side Guiseley. Boshell made 33 league appearances during the season. Boshell was eventually joined by his brother Nicky at the club.

After approaching directors attempting to have manager Steve Kittrick removed from his post, Boshell and his younger brother Nicky were placed on the transfer list. On 15 March 2013 Boshell joined Altrincham on loan for the remainder of the 2012–13 season. Boshell played just 8 times for Altrincham and eventually returned to Guiseley on 22 April 2013.

Altrincham
On 17 May 2013 he signed permanently for Altrincham. Boshell played 7 times for Altrincham before departing the club in October 2013.

Return to Guiseley
In October 2013, Danny re joined Guiseley as player assistant manager under new manager Mark Bower reaching the Play off final against his old club Altrincham F.C. but was unable to play.

He left the club and retired from his playing career on 22 August 2016.

Coaching career

Bradford Park Avenue

In September 2016, Boshell came out of retirement to join Bradford Park Avenue, also taking on the role of assistant manager to his former teammate at Guiseley, Mark Bower.

In July 2019, alongside Bower, Boshell departed Bradford Park Avenue.

In November 2019 Boshell returned as Assistant and again signed on as a player

On 27 February 2023, Boshell came out of retirement due to a shortage of players for their National League North tie with Scarborough Athletic, he was an unused substitute.

Personal life
Boshell has a brother called Nicky who also plays football, Nicky used to be a teammate of Danny at Guiseley. Nicky although coming through the youth ranks at Huddersfield Town has only played at a semi-professional level and went on to play for Brighouse Town and Bradford Park Avenue.

Career statistics

Honours

Player
Grimsby Town
Football League Trophy: Runner-up 2008

Individual
Conference North Team of the Year: 2014–15

References

External links

Profile of Danny Boshell at codalmighty.com

1981 births
Living people
English footballers
Oldham Athletic A.F.C. players
Bury F.C. players
Stockport County F.C. players
Grimsby Town F.C. players
Chesterfield F.C. players
Guiseley A.F.C. players
Altrincham F.C. players
English Football League players
Footballers from Bradford
Association football midfielders
Bradford (Park Avenue) A.F.C. players